Thomas Davids may refer to:

 Thomas William Davids (1816–1884), Welsh nonconformist minister and ecclesiastical historian
 Thomas William Rhys Davids (1843–1922), English scholar of the Pāli language